Lauterbach is a German surname. Notable people with the surname include:

Ann Lauterbach (born 1942), U.S. poet, essayist, and professor

Carl Adolf Georg Lauterbach (1864–1937), German explorer and botanist
Davy Lauterbach (born 1972), painter, poet, and television director
Edward Lauterbach (1844–1923), U.S. political functionary
Heiner Lauterbach (born 1953), German actor
Henry Lauterbach (born 1957), East German track and field athlete and Olympic competitor
Jacob Zallel Lauterbach (1873–1942), U.S. Judaica scholar and author
Josefine Lauterbach (1903–?), Austrian middle-distance runner
Karl Lauterbach (born 1963), German scientist and politician
Maria Lauterbach (1987–2007), U.S. Marines Lance Corporal (see Murder of Maria Lauterbach)
Richard Lauterbach ( World War II era), U.S. TIME magazine Moscow bureau chief during World War II

See also Lauterbach (disambiguation)

German-language surnames
German toponymic surnames